Goodenia redacta is a species of flowering plant in the family Goodeniaceae and is endemic to northern Australia. It is a prostrate to low-lying herb with toothed, egg-shaped leaves at the base of the plant, and racemes of yellow flowers with a brownish centre.

Description
Flowering mainly occurs from April to May.

Taxonomy and naming
Goodenia redacta was first formally described in 1990 by Roger Charles Carolin in the journal Telopea from a specimen collected in 1891 by Joseph Bradshaw and William Allen at a location they thought was the Prince Albert River. The specific epithet (redacta) means "reduced", referring to the small upper lobes of the corolla.

Distribution
This goodenia grows in sandy soil, often on sandstone hills and occurs in the Kimberley region of Western Australia, Arnhem Land in the Northern Territory and the Cape York Peninsula in Queensland.

Conservation status
Goodenia redacta is classified as "not threatened" by the Government of Western Australia Department of Parks and Wildlife and as of "least concern" under the Queensland Government Nature Conservation Act 1992 and the Northern Territory Government Territory Parks and Wildlife Conservation Act 1976.

References

redacta
Eudicots of Western Australia
Flora of the Northern Territory
Flora of Queensland
Plants described in 1990
Taxa named by Roger Charles Carolin
Flora of South Australia